Al-Magharibah is a sub-district located in Mudhaykhirah District, Ibb Governorate, Yemen. Al-Magharibah had a population of 2,625 according to the 2004 census.

References 

Sub-districts in Mudhaykhirah District